The Nilgiri gracile skink (Subdoluseps nilgiriensis) is a species of skink found in Western Ghats ranges in the Nilgiri hills in Tamil Nadu, South India.

Description
Subdoluseps nilgiriensis can be identified by: slender, small-sized body (47–67 mm); sandy brown above, with each scale tipped with black; a thick black lateral band from snout to tail; a distinct white labial streak; dirty white venter, with throat having mild black striations; 28–29 midbody scale rows; 71–74 mid ventral scales; 66–69 paravertebral scales.

Etymology
This species was named after its type locality -  the Nilgiri hills, in the Western Ghats of South India.

Discovery
Subdoluseps nilgiriensis was discovered by scientists in the Anaikatti and Mulli hills of the Nilgiri district of Tamil Nadu, in a farmland surrounded by deciduous forests. First found in 2019, after many months of research it was named and described as new to science, in 2021.

Natural history
Subdoluseps nilgiriensis is most likely a diurnal, insectivorous, skink that lives on dry leaf-litter in deciduous forest belts in mid-elevations (800 m) of these hills. These skinks were seen in marginally human-occupied areas as well, including the place where from they were first sighted. Nothing is known about its reproduction and other life-history traits.

References

Subdoluseps
Reptiles described in 2021